Gianluca Di Chiara (born 26 December 1993) is an Italian footballer who plays as a defender for  club Reggina.

Career

Reggiana
Born in Palermo, Sicily, Di Chiara started his career at Emilian club Parma, and then Reggiana. He was a member of Reggiana's Allievi under-17 team in 2009–10 season. He made his first team debut in 2010–11 Coppa Italia Lega Pro and league debut in the last round of 2010–11 Lega Pro Prima Divisione.

Palermo 
On 29 June 2011, his hometown club Palermo signed Di Chiara in co-ownership deal for €140,000 in a three-year contract. Di Chiara received call-up from Italy national under-19 football team during his stay with Palermo. In June 2012 Palermo bought Di Chiara outright for another €200,000, as well as adding two more year to the contract.

On 26 June 2012, he was signed by Pavia in a temporary deal which Pavia received €25,466 as premi di valorizzazione. On 9 July 2013, Di Chiara and Dario Maltese were signed by Latina.

Catanzaro
On 15 January 2014, Di Chiara was signed by Catanzaro in a temporary deal. On 22 July 2014, Catanzaro signed Di Chiara outright. On 22 January 2015, Di Chiara and Scuffia were signed by fellow Lega Pro club U.S. Lecce in temporary deals, with an option to purchase.

On 3 August 2015, he was signed by Foggia in a temporary deal. On 10 August 2016, Di Chiara left for Serie B club Perugia.

Benevento

Loan to Perugia
On 16 July 2019, he returned to Perugia on loan with an obligation to buy.

Reggina
On 23 September 2020, he joined Reggina on a two-year loan. On 12 August 2022, Di Chiara returned to Reggina on a permanent basis and signed a multi-year contract.

References

External links
 

Living people
1993 births
Footballers from Palermo
Association football defenders
Italian footballers
Parma Calcio 1913 players
A.C. Reggiana 1919 players
Palermo F.C. players
F.C. Pavia players
Latina Calcio 1932 players
U.S. Catanzaro 1929 players
U.S. Lecce players
Benevento Calcio players
A.C. Carpi players
A.C. Perugia Calcio players
Reggina 1914 players
Italy youth international footballers
Serie A players
Serie B players
Serie C players